Loison-sur-Créquoise (literally Loison on Créquoise) is a commune in the Pas-de-Calais department in the Hauts-de-France region of France.

Geography
Loison-sur-Créquoise is situated 7 miles (11 km) southeast of Montreuil-sur-Mer on the D130 road and in the Créquoise river valley.

Population

Places of interest
 The nineteenth century church of Saint Omer

See also
Communes of the Pas-de-Calais department

References

Loisonsurcrequoise